Bali United F.C. Youth Sector is youth set-up of Indonesian professional football club Bali United Football Club. The Youth Sector is made up of various squads divided by age groups. All the Youth Sector squads currently train at the Banteng Field, Seminyak and Tri Sakti Field, Legian. All the youth sector are playing in the Elite Pro Academy (under 20s, under 18s, and under 16s) and Soeratin Cup (under 17s and below).

Since the youth sector inception in 2016, some graduates have gone on to sign professional contracts with Bali United or other clubs.

Organization 
Bali United pays great attention to developing young players and run their own youth training academy in Bali, Kupang, and Lombok. For academy in Bali, they cooperated with Paris Saint-Germain and launched Paris Saint-Germain Academy Bali on 4 December 2016, which ended on 1 July 2019.

After establishing an academy in Bali, they worked with several entrepreneurs in Kupang to establish a football school called Bali United Kristal. The aim of the establishment of the football school is to accommodate the potential of football in Kupang and generally in East Nusa Tenggara.

Bali United Academy Lombok was officially established on 9 January 2019. The goal is that they want to help young players of West Nusa Tenggara to be able to realize their dreams of playing at the highest level of national football with good and quality coaching patterns. Bali United Academy Lombok uses the Filanesia and Bali United methods, and is trained by nationally licensed trainers.

Bali United's management also establish Bali United Elite Academy. Bali United Elite Academy itself is a process of developing young players prepared in the long term. The players who passed the selection received facilities such as housing and scholarships to attend school in one of the schools in Bali.

Honours
 Indonesia Soccer Championship U-21
 Runners-up (1): 2016
 Soeratin Cup U-17 Bali Region
 Winners (1): 2018
 Runners-up (1): 2016
 Soeratin Cup U-13 Bali Region
 Winners (2): 2018, 2019
 Elite Pro Academy Liga 1 U-16
 Runners-up (1): 2018
 Elite Pro Academy Liga 1 U-18
 Winners (1): 2021

Notable former youth team players 
The following is a list of players who have played in Bali United's youth squad and contracted at a senior club football. Players who are currently playing at Bali United, or for another club on loan from Bali United, are highlighted in bold.

  Amrun Mubarok
  I Gede Rio Andreawan
  I Putu Febri Andika
  I Made Andhika Wijaya
  Azka Fauzi
  I Komang Sujana
  Samsul Pellu
  Syeh Fadiel Abdriansyah
  Irvin Sidi
  I Putu Pager Wirajaya
  Arapenta Poerba
  I Kadek Agung Widnyana
  Dallen Doke
  Chairil Zul Azhar
  Reza Irfana
  Kadek Haarlem Anggariva
  Irfan Jauhari
  I Gede Agus Mahendra
  Kadek Dimas Satria
  Komang Tri Arta Wiguna

References

External links 
  

Football clubs in Indonesia
Bali United F.C.
Gianyar Regency
Association football clubs established in 2016
2016 establishments in Indonesia